Nyhavn 51  is an 18th-century canal house overlooking the Nyhavn canal in central Copenhagen, Denmark.Above the door is a painted stone relief depicting a lamb. The property was formerly known as Lammet (English: The Lamb) and the sign was used for identification in a time when house numbers had still not been introduced. The letters are the initials of the builder Henrich Lambertsen Engel and his wife Karen Nielsdatter Holm. The building was listed in the Danish registry of protected buildings and places in 1918. It was subject to Schalburgtage during World War II but restored. Notable former residents include the portrait painter Hans Jørgen Hammer, the marine artist Carl Frederik Sørensen and Swedish actress Eva Eklund.

History

17th and 18th centuries

The property was listed in Copenhagen's first cadastre of 1689 as No. 16 in St. Ann's East Quarter. It was owned by cooper Peder Christensen at that time. The property was listed in the new cadastre of 1756 as No. 26 in St. Ann's East Quarter. It was owned by skipper Stig Pedersen at that time. The present building on the site was constructed for beer seller (øltapper) Henrich Lambertsen Engelin 1766.

No. 26 was home to three households at the 1787 census. Maria Smith, a 73-year-old widow, resided in the building with her son Andreas Smith	and a maid. The son worked for the Danish Asiatic Company. Friederich Hesselberg, a skipper, resided in the building with his wife Helena, their two children (aged one and two), two maids and four lodgers. Jens Knudsen, a sail-maker, resided in the building with his wife Lucie Arth, their three-year-old son, a 16-year-old daughter from his first marriage and a maid.

Peter Marcussen
The property was later acquired by skipper Peter Marcussen. His property was home to five households at the 1801 census. The owner resided in the building with his wife Johanne Steensdatter, their two-year-old son  Rasmus Marcussen, four children from the wife's first marriage (aged three to 14) and one maid. Lauritz Mathiesen, another skipper, resided in the building with his wife Juliane Larsdatter, their one-year-old son and a maid. Christen Steensen, a third skipper, was also among the residents. Christian Gotfried Jørgensen, a fourth skipper, resided in the building with his wife Karen Hansdatter and their one-year-old son. Hans Peter Lunding, a former , resided in the building with his wife 	Kirstine Christensdatter, their three children (aged 14 to 20) and one maid.

The property was again listed as No. 26 in the new cadastre of 1806. It was still owned by Peter Marcussen at that time.

Grønbech family
 
No. 26 was home to four households at the 1834 census. Jørgen Grønbech, a ship captain, resided on the ground floor with his wife Karen Marie Holm, their three children (aged one to seven) and a maid. Christoffer Hvid (1803-1872), an actor at the Royal Danish Theatre, resided on the first floor with his mother Annette Chirstine Hvid and a maid. Karen Steensen, the 76-year-old widow of ship captain C.G.jørgensen, resided on the second floor with two unmarried daughters (both occupied with needlework) and two lodgers (a bookkeeper and a ship captain). Lars Andersen, a workman, resided in the basement with his wife Chrestiane Poulsen, their two children /aged seven and eight) and a maid.

The property was again home to 23 residents in four households at the 1840 census. Jørgen Johan Grønbeck	was still resident on the ground floor with his wife, their three children (one of them from the wife's first marriage, aged five to 13), portrait painter Hans Jørgen Hammer, painter William Hammer	, mate Emil Christian Hammer and one maid. Carl Michael Møller, a bookkeeper, resided on the first floor with his wife  Karen Christine Carlsen	, their two children (aged one and four) and one maid. Karen Jørgensen (née Steensen), widow of a skipper, resided on the second floor with two unmarried daughters (aged 31 and 33) and one lodger. Johan Frederiksen, a grain grinder (kornmaler), resided in the basement with his wife Johanne Nielsen and their three children (aged one to seven).

The property was home to 19 residents in four chouseholds at the 1850 census. Karen Marie Grønbech, who had now become a widow, resided on the second floor with her three children (aged 15 to 23), one maid and one lodger. Morten Andersen, a ship captain, resided on the first floor with his wife Marie Cathrine (née Andernsen), their three children (aged 19 to 28( and one maid. The marine artist Carl Frederik Sørensen resided on the ground floor with his wife Bine Augustine Sørensen, their one-year-old daughter Maria Jacobine Sørensen and one maid. Fritz Iversen, a sailor, resided in the basement with his wife Johanne Dorthea Iversen	and their 12-year-old son Frederik Johan Iversen.

1860 census
The property was home to four households at the 1860 census. Marie Margrethe Barfred (née Didrichsen, 1794-1875), widow of navqal officer and customs inspector in Frederikshavn Jens Lauritz Barfred (1678-1855). resided in one of the apartments with her 36-year-old daughter Emma Adolphine Marie Barfred and one maid. Niels Christian Petersen, a barkeeper, resided in the building with his wife Karen Sophie Petersen. Hans Joachim Herman Toldberg. a floor clerk, resided in the building on his own.
 Ane Rosendahl, wife of Jens Rosendahl (who is not mentioned as a resident), resided in the building with their three children (aged one to five) and one maid.

20th century
The building was listed by the Danish Heritage Agency in the Danish national registry of protected buildings in 1918. The restaurant Det Gyldne Lam (The Golden Lamb) was for many years located in the cellar. The building was subject to Schalburgtage on 21 September 1944. Two people were injured. The property was renovated by the architect Erik Stengade in 1946 for its owner R. Høg-Petersen. The renovation received an award from Copenhagen Municipality in 1949. .

Høg-Petersen married the Swedish-born dancer, singer and composer Eva Eklund. She inherited the restaurant after her husband in 1962. She turned it into one of the most popular places in Nyhavn. It was known for its live music.

Architecture

The building is constructed with three storeys over a walk-out basement and is just three bays wide. The facade is crowned by a two-bay habled wall dormer. Above the door is a painted stone relief depicting a lamb. The property was formerly known as Lammet (The Lamb) and the sign was used for identification in a time when house numbers had still not been introduced. The letters are the initials of the builder Henrich Lambertsen Engel and his wife Karen Nielsdatter Holm.

Today
The property is owned by E/F Nyhavn 51. The building is now home to the pizzeria La Sirene.

In popular culture
 In the 1933 film Nyhavn 17, a wedding carriage stops in front of the building and the main character disappears down into the restaurant..
 The restaurant in the cellar plays a central role in the 1967 comedy Nyhavns glade gutter where it is called Restaurant Trinidad. The  screenplay for the film was written by its owner, Eva Eklund, who also composed the music for two of its songs and had a small role.

Gallery

References

External links

 Nyhavn at indenforvoldene.dk
 Source
 Jørgen Grønbech ship

Houses in Copenhagen
Listed residential buildings in Copenhagen
Houses completed in 1766